Rush Hour, known in Europe as Speedster, is a video game developed by Clockwork Entertainment and published by Psygnosis for the PlayStation and Windows in 1997. The PlayStation version was ported to Japan and published by Nihon Bussan under the name  on April 29, 1998.

Reception

The PlayStation version received mixed reviews according to the review aggregation website GameRankings. Next Generation said that the game "has a definite retrogaming flavor to its gameplay, but its contemporary graphics and execution give the experience new life."

Notes

References

External links
 

1997 video games
PlayStation (console) games
Psygnosis games
Racing video games
Video games developed in the United Kingdom
Windows games